Master Dhanraj (also credited as Dhanraj Master) is an India musician, multi-instrumentalist from Tamil Nadu.

Biography and career
Master Dhanraj is a famous and renowned music teacher in Madras (now Chennai). He have made musical research on the epic Silappatikaram. Orchestration for the grand Tamil movie Chandralekha was done by Dhanraj.

He is well known as the guru of greats such as Maestro Ilaiyaraaja, and Mozart of Madras A. R. Rahman. The Melody King Vidyasagar, and Malayalam music director Shyam are also students of Master. Veteran Chennai-based music teacher Mr.A.Abdul Sattar (who was the guru of music directors Harris Jayaraj, D.Imman, S.Thaman, S.J.Suriya) and has won the Best Teacher Award from Trinity College London for the past 25 consecutive years is also a student of Dhanraj.

Ilaiyaraaja (Previously called as Raasayya) joined Dhanraj Master as a student to learn musical instruments and the master renamed and called him as just "Raaja".

He is famous for teaching Western classical music.

Books 
Bramma Mela Pramanam

Isai Vithi

180 Degree

Acclaim 
Dhanraj master was considered to be the bedrock of western music in Chennai. He was one of the trios who laid the foundation for Chennai becoming a hub of Western classical music.

Renowned students of Dhanraj includes,

References

People from Tamil Nadu
Tamil musicians
Tamil film score composers
Living people
Year of birth missing (living people)